Rhombodera zhangi is a species of praying mantises in the family Mantidae, found in China.

See also
List of mantis genera and species

References

Z
Mantodea of Asia
Insects of China
Insects described in 1993